Metius is a genus of beetles in the family Carabidae, containing the following species:

 Metius aeneus (Dejean, 1831)
 Metius andicola (Dejean, 1831)
 Metius annulicornis Curtis, 1839
 Metius apicalis Straneo, 1986
 Metius auratoides Straneo, 1986
 Metius blandus (Dejean, 1828)
 Metius bolivianus Straneo, 1951
 Metius bonariensis (Putzeys, 1875)
 Metius brunnescens Straneo, 1951
 Metius canotae Steinheil, 1869
 Metius carnifex (Dejean, 1828)
 Metius caudatus (Putzeys, 1875)
 Metius chilensis (Dejean, 1831)
 Metius circumfusus (Germar, 1824)
 Metius confusus Straneo, 1951
 Metius constrictus Straneo, 1951
 Metius cordatulus Straneo, 1951
 Metius cordatus (Putzeys, 1875)
 Metius eurypterus (Putzeys, 1875)
 Metius femoratus (Dejean, 1828)
 Metius flavipes (Dejean, 1828)
 Metius flavipleuris Straneo, 1951
 Metius foveolatus (Putzeys, 1875)
 Metius gigas Straneo, 1953
 Metius gilvipes (Dejean, 1828)
 Metius guillermoi Will, 2005
 Metius harpaloides Curtis, 1839
 Metius hassenteufeli Straneo, 1960
 Metius incertus (Putzeys, 1875)
 Metius kulti Straneo, 1952
 Metius kuscheli Straneo, 1955
 Metius latemarginatus Straneo, 1951
 Metius latigastricus (Dejean, 1828)
 Metius latior Putzeys, 1875
 Metius loeffleri Straneo, 1986
 Metius luridus (Chaudoir, 1837)
 Metius malachiticus (Dejean, 1828)
 Metius marginatus (Dejean, 1828)
 Metius mateui Straneo, 1986
 Metius melancholicus Straneo, 1952
 Metius negrei Straneo, 1977
 Metius niger (Motschulsky, 1866)
 Metius obscurus (Putzeys, 1875)
 Metius obtusus Straneo, 1951
 Metius parvicollis (Putzeys, 1875)
 Metius parvulus Straneo, 1952
 Metius peruvianus Straneo, 1951
 Metius pogonoides (Fairmaire, 1883)
 Metius punctulatus Putzeys, 1875
 Metius robustus Straneo, 1951
 Metius rotundatus Straneo, 1951
 Metius rotundicollis Straneo, 1951
 Metius silvestrii Straneo, 1951
 Metius striatus (Putzeys, 1875)
 Metius striolatus Straneo, 1951
 Metius subcoeruleus Straneo, 1951
 Metius subfoveolatus Straneo, 1951
 Metius submetallicus Straneo, 1986
 Metius subsericeus Straneo, 1952
 Metius titschacki Straneo, 1951
 Metius viridulus Straneo, 1953
 Metius zischkai Straneo, 1960

References

 
Carabidae genera